Bastide is a French surname. Notable people with the surname include:

John Henry Bastide, British soldier and military engineer
Jules Bastide, French politician
Lauren Bastide (born 1981), French journalist
Paul Bastide, French conductor and composer
Roger Bastide, French sociologist and anthropologist

French-language surnames